Ja jesam odavde (trans. I Am from Here) is the first and so far the only live album by former Yugoslav and Serbian rock band Galija. The album was recorded on Galija concert held on March 8, 1998 in Čair Sports Center, Niš.

Ja jesam odavde is one of two Galija albums (the other one being the 1999 studio album Južnjačka uteha) recorded without vocalist Predrag Milosavljević.

Track listing
"Da me nisi" – 3:49
"Žena koje nema" – 4:25
"Skadarska" – 3:37
"Milica" – 5:49
"Pismo" – 4:40
"Decimen" – 11:32
"Gospa" – 5:08
"Ja nisam odavde" – 6:05
"Noć" – 5:06
"Stare trube" – 5:43
"Dodirni me" – 6:47
"Kotor" – 6:07
"Još uvek sanjam" – 6:58

Personnel
Nenad Milosavljević - vocals, acoustic guitar, harmonica
Saša Ranđelović - guitar
Saša Lokner - keyboard
Slaviša Pavlović - bass guitar
Boban Pavlović - drums
Dragutin Jakovljević - guitar

Guest musicians
Gordana Svilarević - backing vocals
Ivana Ćosić - backing vocals

References 
 EX YU ROCK enciklopedija 1960-2006,  Janjatović Petar;  

1998 live albums
PGP-RTS live albums
Galija live albums